Alpenus thomasi is a moth of the family Erebidae. It was described by Watson in 1989. It is found in Cameroon, Nigeria and the Central African Republic.

References

Moths described in 1989
Spilosomina
Insects of Cameroon
Insects of West Africa
Fauna of the Central African Republic
Moths of Africa